Sesommata trachyptera is a moth of the family Palaephatidae, found in the Valdivian forest region. It was described by Davis in 1986. 

Adults are on wing from November to March, probably univoltine.

References

Moths described in 1986
Palaephatidae
Fauna of the Valdivian temperate rainforest